John Michael Lovett AM (10 July 1943 – 30 October 2003) was a former Australian government administrator who made the breakthrough in the development of deaf sports in Australia. He was also the former President of the International Committee of Sports for the Deaf, served as the 7th president from 1995-2003 until his death.

John Lovett was appointed a Member of the Order of Australia (AM) by the Australian government in the 1986 Australia Day Honours, "for service to those with impaired hearing." He was married to a former British Deaflympic swimmer, Jill Diana Lovett.

Death 
Lovett died in an hospital in Melbourne, Australia on 30 October due to blood cancer. He served as the President of the ICSD prior to his death.

Awards and honours 
 Membership of the Order of Australia (AM)
 Edward Miner Gallaudet Award at the  Gallaudet University
 CISS medal of honour - gold in 1993
 CISS medal of honour - silver in 1985

References 

1943 births
2003 deaths
Deaf activists
Australian public servants
People from Melbourne
Activists from Melbourne
Australian deaf people
Members of the Order of Australia